(Benson) Nathaniel Aipa was an Anglican bishop in Malawi. 

Ainani studied for the priesthood at St John's College, Lusaka. He was ordained in 1963 and served in the Diocese of Malawi. He was appointed Archdeacon of Mangochi in 1978, and Bishop of Southern Malawi in 1987.

References

Anglican bishops of Southern Malawi
20th-century Anglican bishops in Malawi
Anglican archdeacons in Africa